The Casilla del Caminero is a 19th-century structure located in the University of Puerto Rico at Mayagüez.

History 
In the second-half of the 19th century, there was an expansion is the transportation system, both on the high seas and on land, to protect this routes lighthouses and casas de camineros (or road worker's homes), respectively, were built. The one in possession of the University of Puerto Rico at Mayagüez was built in 1883, after the engineer Manuel Maese had submitted his project for the section from Añasco to Mayagüez on 12 March 1882. This project only consisted of two houses, one in each municipality. Only the one in the campus survives, since the other one was a victim of road expansion."

The style of the casilla, designated as Style 2 by the university Biology professor, Dr. José A. Mari Mut, who did an exhaustive study of these homes. This style was a refinement of Style 1. All "the superior borders of the holes for the entry door and for all the windows are straight." The windows reached the foot of the structure, and the cornice surrounds it completely. Inside, "each room has its own door to the living room and the wall that divides them reaches the roof."

Its internal division into two parts corresponded to the fact that two road workers and their families lived there. Each road worker was responsible for three kilometres to each opposite side of the road from the structure.

The Casilla del Caminero, as the oldest structure in the campus is popularly called, suffered damages from the San Fermín earthquake, which occurred on 11 October 1918. Two years later, on 1920, the structure was repaired by installing "a system of internal rods screwed into exterior plates which tied and stabilized the walls." Additionally, "the shed wall was extended up using materials so alike to the original that in antique photographs it seems like an original wall; however, the project plan reveals that this is not the case." The "[C]asilla suffered more changes later, which included the addition of a portico of concrete, which was eliminated when the casilla was moved, and of an eave over a lateral window converted into a door," which was destroyed when a tree that was permitted to grow inside the Casilla collapsed as a result of the Hurricane María winds.

In the mid 1950s, the road workers program is shutdown and the structure comes to be an office for the Department of Transportation and Public Works (DTOP).

In 1988 the DTOP regional office was planning to transfer and agreed with the then-Rector of the camps, Dr. José L. Martínez Picó, so that the property would be restored by the campus to "give it practical use of interest to the Campus and to the People of Puerto Rico."

The 6 August 1994 the House of Representatives approved Joint Resolution 937, converting it in Number 433, whereby the structure was transferred, with 2,358.23 m2 of land (a previous version only delineated  a plot of land of 2,067.822m2), for the cost of $1.00 from DTOP to the campus. The campus had "an indispensable requirement...that if at any moment the Campus...did not have use for this property, the title would revert to the [DTOP]..."

In the first half of the decade of the 1990s, the Post Road, later to be named the Alfonso Valdés Cobián Boulevard (PR-2R), was expanded, and the structure was moved back from the road, adding the base cement and the transfer of the title of the property was completed.

In the Joint Resolution, the purpose of the structure was mentioned to be "for a museum or cultural purposes " and that "[n]obody better than the Campus...to be custodian of  this asset of our national heritage."

Timeline

References 

1883 establishments in Puerto Rico
Relocated buildings and structures in the United States
Spanish Colonial architecture in Puerto Rico
Transportation in Puerto Rico
University of Puerto Rico at Mayagüez